Kedy is a rural locality (a selo) in Tsumadinsky District of the Republic of Dagestan, Russia, located in the mountains near the Chechen border.

Kedy is also considered as a capital of Unqraq, the historic territory in Tsumadinskiy district which include 9 villages.

Geographic location
Kedy is situated on a valley among mountains. River flows at the center of the village.

Population
Avars (all of Muslim faith) live in the village and speak the Avar language.

Migration
After involuntary resettlement to Vedeno (The Chechen Republic) in 1950th, part of population returned to the village and others left to different Dagestani villages. Now immigrants from Kedy live in Makhachkala and generally in such villages as Shava (Babayurtovskiy district), Haji-Dada (Kumtorkalinskiy district), Kobi (Chechnya, Shelcovskoy district) and Aksay (Khasavyurtovskiy district).

Notable people
 Makhach Murtazaliev — is an Avar born-Russian Olympic wrestler who won the bronze medal for Russia at the 2004 Summer Olympics in Athens.

References

Rural localities in Tsumadinsky District